The 1994–95 CD Toluca season is the 78th campaign in existence and 45th consecutive season in the top flight division of Mexican football.

Summary
In summertime Grupo Modelo reinforced the squad with several transfers in: young Hondurian Striker Carlos Alberto Pavón, Argentine Forward Claudio Spontón, Hugo Guerra, Jesús Alfaro, César Suárez, and Forward Martín Simental. Two decisions affected the club performance: the best player Roberto Depietri left the club after 4 superb campaigns  and not renewing the contract for Blas Giunta. Meanwhile a promising Carlos Pavón scoring goals was cut by the club board due to his matches abroad representing Honduras National Football Team, the same fate followed young talents Sigifredo Mercado and Ricardo Velázquez and the season became "an authentic Hell" for "Diablos".

The chaotic campaign was due to four different managers until Luis Garisto took the job and managing the season on a 16th league spot. The squad suffered 18 lost matches the worst record ever. During mid-season arrived future club legend Forward Jose Cardozo who was injured 8 weeks and scoring his first goal upon March. Owing to the  campaign disaster, Grupo Modelo sacked Fernandez del Cojo and appointed Sergio Pelaez Farell as new club President for the next season.

Squad

Transfers

Winter

Competitions

La Liga

League table

Group 3

General table

Results by round

Matches

Statistics

Goalscorers 
8. Marcelino Bernal

References

External links

1994–95 Mexican Primera División season
Mexican football clubs 1994–95 season
Deportivo Toluca F.C. seasons